Laagri is a small borough in Harju County, northern Estonia. It is located in Saue Parish. As of 2011 Census, the settlement's population was 5,165.

Gallery

References

External links
Saue Parish 

Boroughs and small boroughs in Estonia